The Florence Blue Jays Baseball Club was a minor league baseball team based in Florence, South Carolina. 

They began play in the South Atlantic League in 1981 where they eventually captured the league title in 1985. 

After the 1986 season the team relocated and became the Myrtle Beach Blue Jays (now the Hagerstown Suns). 

They were a minor league club of the Toronto Blue Jays and played at American Legion Stadium.

Notable alumni

 Geronimo Berroa (1985) 
 Pat Borders (1983-1984, 1986) 1992 World Series Most Valuable Player

 Tony Castillo (1984)

 Rob Ducey (1985)

 Cecil Fielder (1983) 3 x MLB All-Star

 Glenallen Hill (1984) 
 Jimmy Key (1982) 5 x MLB All-Star; 1987 AL ERA Title

 Nelson Liriano (1983) 
 Fred McGriff (1983) 5 x MLB All-Star

 José Mesa (1983-1984) 2 x MLB All-Star

 Greg Myers (1985)

 Mike Sharperson (1982) MLB All-Star

 David Wells (1986) 3 x MLB All-Star; 239 MLB Wins

Year-by-Year Record

South Atlantic League All-Stars
First Base: Cecil Fielder (1983)
Second Base: Garry Harris (1981)
Shortstop: Ralph "Rocket" Wheeler (1981), Santiago Garcia (1985)
Catcher: Dave Stenhouse (1983)
Pitcher: Tim England (1985)
Outfield: Sil Campusano (1985)(also league Most Valuable Player for 1985)
Manager: Hector Torres (1985)

South Atlantic League Season Leaders

Pitching
Shutouts: 3, Doug Welenc (1981)
Strikeouts: 186, Devallon Harper (1982) 210, Tim Englund (1985)
Strikeouts per 9 innings: 10.14, Devallon Harper (1982)
Winning Percentage: .750, Tim Englund (1985) (18-6)
Games Started:  30, Tim Englund (1985)  28, Mike Jones (1986)
Wins: 18, Tim Englund (1985)
Saves: 18, Joey Pursell (1982)
Games Finished: 46, Joey Pursell (1982)
Runs Allowed: 116, Jose Mesa (1983) 116, Dane Johnson (1986)
Earned Runs Allowed: 96, Dane Johnson (1986)

Hitting
Runs Batted In: 85, Pat Borders (1984) (tied with one other)
Stolen Bases: 83, Bernie Tatis (1982)
Caught Stealing: 18, Bernie Tatis (1982)
Slugging Percentage: .443, Pat Borders (1984)
At Bats: 502, Webster Garrison (1984)
Doubles: 35, Santiago Garcia (1985)
Struck Out: 208, Darrell Landrum (1985)(tied all-time league record)  161, Wayne Davis (1986)

References
Encyclopedia of Minor League Baseball: The Official Record of Minor League Baseball Editors – Lloyd Johnson, Miles Wolff. Publisher: Baseball America, 2007. Format: Hardback, 767 pp. Language: English. 

Defunct South Atlantic League teams
Toronto Blue Jays minor league affiliates
1981 establishments in South Carolina
1986 disestablishments in South Carolina
Professional baseball teams in South Carolina
Defunct baseball teams in South Carolina
Baseball teams disestablished in 1986
Baseball teams established in 1981